"Puppy Love" is the third single by rapper Lil' Bow Wow's debut album Beware of Dog (2000). The song was written by Bryan-Michael Cox Brian Casey, Brandon Casey and Jermaine Dupri (who also produced the song). It features R&B group Jagged Edge and samples the beat of LL Cool J's song "Kanday" from his album Bigger and Deffer. The music video premiered on June 19, 2001, and features singer and actress Solange Knowles as the rapper's love interest.

Charts

References

2001 songs
Song recordings produced by Jermaine Dupri
Bow Wow (rapper) songs
Songs written by Bryan-Michael Cox
Songs written by Jermaine Dupri
So So Def Recordings singles